Frekhaug is a village in Alver Municipality, located in Vestland county, Norway. The village sits at the southern tip of the island of Holsnøy. Prior to 2020, the village was the administrative centre of the old municipality of Meland.

Frekhaug Manor
Frekhaug Manor (Frekhaug hovedgård) is a manor house and farm located on the southeast side of Holsnøy. The main house is a notched, two-story log house of painted white panel with a hipped roof. The building has a portal in rococo. The building was probably built in the 1780s and is surrounded by granite walls. In 1780, the farm was bought by skipper Cort Abrahamsen Holtermann (1730-1813).

Since 1914, the manor house has been owned by the Nordhordland home mission (Nordhordland indremisjon).

Notable people
Trond Bjørndal, football coach and former player

References

Alver (municipality)
Villages in Vestland